Michael Dorfman (born 17 September 1954) is a writer, essayist, journalist, human rights activist and activist of the Yiddish culture revivalist movement.

Career 

He was an activist of the Yiddish culture revivalist movement among Russian Jewry. Dorfman published three books and roughly 150 articles about the Yiddish Culture revivalist movement. He is an organizer of many festivals and cultural events in Russia and Ukraine.

He was first published in the Russian-Israeli magazine Kroog (The Circle) in 1983. Dorfman later worked as the publisher and chief-editor of the Russian-Israeli newspapers Negev and Aspects between 1992 and 1999. He pioneered print journalism for local Russian-speaking communities.

In 1994, Dorfman established the NGO LaMerkhav ('At large' in Hebrew) which dealt with abuse, violence, and discrimination in Israeli public schools. Projects included a hotline for children, the Center for Monitoring Child Abuse, and support groups for schoolchildren who were victims of hate-motivated violence. LaMerkhav conducted unique projects for developing community leadership for young people

In 1999, he led an initiative with the Russian Panthers that turned Israel's public attention to the problems and racism faced by Russian children in public schools.

In 2000–2009, he contributed to human rights and social justice groups in Israel and territories under Israeli occupation.

Texts by Dorfman are recommended in the Russian Jewish Schools Network.

Books 
 Михаэль Дорфман, Евреи и жизнь. Холокост – это смешно?
 Михаэль Дорфман, Евреи и жизнь. Свастика в Иерусалиме , Second edition , 978-5-903925-07-0, Third edition 
 Михаэль Дорфман, Евреи и жизнь. Холокост – это смешно? , Second edition , 978-5-903925-10-0, 978-5-226-01029-3

References

Further reading 
 Biography published in the book Михаэль Дорфман, Евреи и жизнь. Холокост – это смешно?  ACT, Moscow, 2008
 Biography,  Quarterly review Nota Bene, issue 18 Jerusalem 2006.
 Biography at Jewish Literary Review Booknik, Moscow.

1954 births
Living people
Journalists from Lviv
Ukrainian Jews
Soviet emigrants to Israel
Russian-language writers
Israeli writers